The Boonton Formation is a mapped bedrock unit in New Jersey, formerly divided between the Boonton and Whitehall beds of the defunct Brunswick Formation.  It is named for the town of Boonton, New Jersey, which is near where its type section was described by paleontologist Paul E. Olsen.

Description 
The Boonton Formation is composed of reddish-brown to reddish-purple fine grained sandstone, as well as red, gray, purple, and black siltstone and mudstone.  Siltstone and mudstone layers can be calcareous and feature dolomitic concretions.  A well known fossil fish bed is known to exist in a carbonate rich siltstone near the top of the formation.  Additionally, cross-bedded conglomerate layers interfinger with beds of the formation, usually bearing clasts of gneiss and granite.

Depositional environment 
The Boonton Formation can be characterized as the uppermost continuation of the Passaic Formation, which is mostly playa and alluvial fan deposits resulting from the rifting of Pangea.  However, unlike the Passaic Formation, which is primarily red in color due to arid conditions at the time of deposition, the Boonton Formation contains a much more significant portion of non-red layers, indicative of lakes present during wetter periods.   
 
A chief difference between the Boonton Formation and all other formations of the Newark Basin is that the lower part of the formation lacks a cyclic deposition pattern.  Typically, the sedimentary formations of the Newark Basin feature recurring periods of wet and dry deposition, resulting in a series of alternating red and gray-black beds.  However, the lower beds of the Boonton Formation show a wide variety of color and texture arranged in no particular order.

Fossils 
Fish fossils, including the ray-finned Semiontus elegans, the coelacanth Diplurus longicaudatus, and others, such as Redfieldius and Ptycholepis, can be found in the uppermost parts of the formation.  In other layers, indeterminate fossil ornithischian tracks have been noted (Anomoepus is reported), along with additional reptile and dinosaur prints, such as those of Batrachopus, and the theropod Grallator.  Fossil conifer remains, as well as other plant related fossils such as root structures and pollen, are also found in the formation.

Age 
The Boonton Formation rests conformably above the Hook Mountain Basalt, placing its deposition sometime between approximately 197 and 190 million years ago during the late Hettangian stage and Sinemurian stage of the Jurassic.

See also 
 Geology of New Jersey
 List of dinosaur-bearing rock formations
 List of stratigraphic units with ornithischian tracks
 Indeterminate ornithischian tracks

References

Bibliography 
 Weishampel, David B.; Dodson, Peter; and Osmólska, Halszka (eds.): The Dinosauria, 2nd, Berkeley: University of California Press. 861 pp. .

Geologic formations of New Jersey
Jurassic geology of New Jersey
Hettangian Stage
Sinemurian Stage
Sandstone formations of the United States
Siltstone formations
Mudstone formations
Ichnofossiliferous formations
Fossiliferous stratigraphic units of North America
Paleontology in New Jersey